Janette Oke (née Steeves; born February 18, 1935) (pronounced "oak") is a Canadian author of inspirational fiction. Her books are often set in a pioneer era and centered on female protagonists. Her first novel, Love Comes Softly, was published by Bethany House in 1979. , more than 75 others have followed. The first novel of her Canadian West series, When Calls the Heart (1983), became the basis of the current television series of the same name.

Biography
Janette Steeves was born in Champion, Alberta, to Canadian prairie farmers Fred and Amy (née Ruggles) Steeves, during the Great Depression years.

Oke graduated from Mountain View Bible College in Didsbury, Alberta, where she met her future husband, Edward Oke, who later became the president of that college. The Okes have four children, including a set of twins. Oke's daughter, Laurel Oke Logan, has co-written books with her.

Oke is a committed Evangelical Christian. She has written many books about her faith.

Awards
Oke received the 1992 President's Award from the Evangelical Christian Publishers Association for her significant contribution to Christian fiction, as well as the 1999 CBA Life Impact Award, and the Gold Medallion Award for fiction.

List of books by Janette Oke

Love Comes Softly series
This series is published by Bethany House.

 Love Comes Softly, 1979
 Love's Enduring Promise, 1980
 Love's Long Journey, 1982
 Love's Abiding Joy, 1983
 Love's Unending Legacy, 1984
 Love's Unfolding Dream, 1987
 Love Takes Wing, 1988
 Love Finds a Home, 1989

This series has also been published into two boxsets, Volume 1–4 and Volume 5–8.  New revisions with updated covers were published in 2003 and 2004, including the boxsets.

The  Fox Faith film versions of the "Love Comes Softly" series, which aired on the Hallmark Channel, do not completely follow the books. They starred Katherine Heigl, Dale Midkiff, Corbin Bernsen, Erin Cottrell, and others. Directors of the films included Michael Landon Jr. and Lou Diamond Phillips.

There are also three prequels titled Love's Christmas Journey (2012), Love Begins (2011), and Love's Everlasting Courage (2011).

A Prairie Legacy series 
This series is published by Bethany House.

 The Tender Years, 1997
 A Searching Heart, 1998
 A Quiet Strength, 1999
 Like Gold Refined, 2000

This is a follow-up to the Love Comes Softly series. A republished edition is now available.

Seasons of the Heart series
This series is published by Bethany House.

 Once Upon a Summer, 1981
 The Winds of Autumn, 1987
 Winter Is Not Forever, 1988
 Spring's Gentle Promise, 1989

This series was republished in 2002 with updated covers. It is about a young boy, Josh Jones, who is trying to find himself with his atypical family.

Canadian West series
This series is published by Bethany House. The last two books came much later and focus on the children in the series rather than the main characters of the first four books. In 2015 all six books were released as a single ebook.

 When Calls the Heart, 1983
 When Comes the Spring, 1985
 When Breaks the Dawn, 1985
 When Hope Springs New, 1986
 Beyond the Gathering Storm, 1999
 When Tomorrow Comes, 2000

Return to the Canadian West series
This series is published by Bethany House. The series is co-written by Janette Oke and her daughter, Laurel Oke Logan. 
 Where Courage Calls, 2014
 Where Trust Lies, 2015
 Where Hope Prevails, 2016

When Hope Calls series
Co-written with Laurel Oke Logan
 Unyielding Hope, 2020
 Sustaining Faith, 2021
 Unfailing Love, 2022

Song of Acadia series
Co-written with T. Davis Bunn and published by Bethany House.

 The Meeting Place, 1999
 The Sacred Shore, 2000
 The Birthright, 2001
 The Distant Beacon, 2002
 The Beloved Land, 2002

This series is continued on by T. Davis Bunn and Isabella Bunn in the follow-up series, Heirs of Acadia.

Acts of Faith series
Co-written with T. Davis Bunn and published by Bethany House.

The Centurion's Wife, 2009
The Hidden Flame, January 2010
The Damascus Way, 2011

Standalone books 
 Return to Harmony, co-written with T. Davis Bunn
 Another Homecoming, co-written with T. Davis Bunn
 Tomorrow's Dream, co-written with T. Davis Bunn
 Dana's Valley, co-written with Laurel Oke Logan

Women of the West books 
These books are standalone novels about different women of the West, where the author's intention is that they do not need to be read in order.

 The Calling of Emily Evans, 1990
 Julia's Last Hope, 1990
 Roses for Mama, 1990
 A Woman Named Dâmaris, 1991
 They Called Her Mrs. Doc, 1992
 The Measure of a Heart, 1992
 A Bride for Donnigan, 1993
 Heart of the Wilderness, 1993
 Too Long a Stranger, 1994
 The Bluebird and the Sparrow, 1995
 A Gown of Spanish Lace, 1995
 Drums of Change, 1995

Youth books
 I Wonder… Did Jesus Have a Pet Lamb? (picture book)

Janette Oke's Animal Friends series
 The Impatient Turtle
 The Prodigal Cat
 Spunky's Diary
 This Little Pig
 New Kid in Town
 Ducktails
 Prairie Dog Town
 Trouble in a Fur Coat
 Maury Had a Little Lamb
 Pordy's Prickly Problem
 A Cote of Many Colors
 Who's New at the Zoo?
 Janette Oke's Animal Friends Pack, vols. 1–6
 Janette Oke's Animal Friends Pack, vols. 7–12

Other Items by Janette Oke
 Celebrating the Inner Beauty of Women Dec 1997
 Father Who Calls: Devotional insights for Daily Meditations
 Hunger of Your Heart: Finding Fulfillment Through a Closer Walk With God
 Janette Oke Engagement Diary
 Janette Oke 2001 Engagement Diary (Calendar)
 Janette Oke's Reflections on the Christmas Story
 Making Memories by Janette Oke and Cheri Bladholm
 My favorite recipes: Featuring devotional & selected recipes
 My Favorite Verse
 The Father of Love
 The Loving Heart-Calendar
 What Does Love Look Like by Janette Oke and Cheri Bladholm
 ''Nana's Gift (novella) 2011

References

External links

1935 births
Living people
20th-century Canadian novelists
21st-century Canadian novelists
20th-century Canadian women writers
21st-century Canadian women writers
Canadian women novelists
Canadian children's writers
Christian writers
People from Vulcan County
Writers from Alberta
Canadian women children's writers